Van Buren State Park is a  state park on Lake Michigan  south of South Haven, Michigan, United States. The park, which is maintained and operated by the Michigan Department of Natural Resources, is located in the southwest corner of South Haven Township and the northwest corner of Covert Township, just north of the Palisades Nuclear Power Plant. The Van Buren County–owned North Point Conservation Area is located directly north of the park. The park has forested sand dunes, camping, and a swimming beach.

History
Van Buren was established in 1966 after purchase of the park's first  from the Harry LaBar Drake family in 1965. Two subsequent land purchases further expanded the park's boundaries.

Activities and amenities
The park offers swimming, picnicking, playground, and a 220-site campground.

References

External links 

Van Buren State Park Michigan Department of Natural Resources
Van Buren State Park Map Michigan Department of Natural Resources

State parks of Michigan
Beaches of Michigan
Protected areas of Van Buren County, Michigan
Landforms of Van Buren County, Michigan
Protected areas established in 1966
1966 establishments in Michigan
IUCN Category III